Rags and All that Jazz is the third album by the London-based Swingle II singers released in 1975 on the CBS label. All tracks from this album were also included in the 2009 Sony Classical compilation, Swing Sing.  
The original Paris-based The Swingle Singers recorded regularly for Philips in the 1960s and early 1970s and the successor London-based group (Swingle II) continued to record, for Columbia/CBS, Virgin Classics and other record labels from 1974 to the present.

Track listing

All lyrics by Tony Vincent Isaacs
Side 1
"Hotshot” (Scott Joplin) - 2:25
"The Wanderer (Solace)" (Scott Joplin) - 3:45
"Movie Star (Kansas City Stomp)” (F. ‘Jelly Roll’ Morton) - 2:10
"In a Mist" (Leon ‘Bix’ Beiderbecke) - 4:25
”Mr. Superman (Elite Syncopations)” (Scott Joplin) - 2:12

Side 2
"Alligator Crawl" (Thomas ‘Fats’ Waller) - 3:00
"Heliotrope Bouquet” (Scott Joplin) - 2:48
"Chicago Breakdown” (F. ‘Jelly Roll’ Morton) - 3:20
"Grandpa’s Spells" (F. ‘Jelly Roll’ Morton) - 1:48
"Weeping Willow" (Scott Joplin) - 3:48

Singers
Olive Simpson & Catherine Bott – sopranos
Carol Hall & Linda Hirst – mezzo sopranos
John Potter & Ward Swingle – tenors
John Lubbock & David Beavan - basses

Musicians
Patrick Gowers – keyboards
Allan Walley – bass guitar and double bass
Tony McVey - drums

Production
Arrangements and adaptions: Ward Swingle
Producers: Ward Swingle & Terry Edwards
Engineer: Steve Taylor
Album art direction: Roslav Szaybo (CBS Records)
Album design/montage: Keith Davis

References

The Swingle Singers albums
1975 albums
CBS Records albums